Quants may refer to:

 Quants Reserve, a nature reserve in Somerset, England
 Quantitative analysts
 The Quants, a book by Scott Paterson about hedge funds that use quantitative analysis

See also
 Quant (disambiguation)